Boťany is a village and municipality in the Trebišov District in the Košice Region of eastern Slovakia.

History
In historical records the village was first mentioned in 1332.

Geography
The village lies at an altitude of 103 metres and covers an area of 19.522 km².

Demographics
Bot'any has a population of 1,283 people.  The village is about 70% Hungarian, 20% Gypsy and 10% Slovak.  78.52% of its population is Roman Catholic.

Facilities
The village has a post office, a public library and a football pitch.

Genealogical resources

The records for genealogical research are available at the state archive "Statny Archiv in Kosice, Slovakia"

 Roman Catholic church records (births/marriages/deaths): 1719-1922 (parish A)
 Greek Catholic church records (births/marriages/deaths): 1795-1905 (parish B)
 Reformated church records (births/marriages/deaths): 1809-1929 (parish B)

See also
 List of municipalities and towns in Slovakia

References

External links
http://www.botany.ocu.sk
Surnames of living people in Botany

Villages and municipalities in Trebišov District
Zemplín (region)